Blane is a given name. Notable people with the name include:

Blane Comstock (born 1949), American icde hockey player
Blane De St. Croix, American artist
Blane Gaison (born 1958), American football player
M. Blane Michael, (1943–2011), American judge
Blane Morgan (born 1977), American football coach
Blane David Nordahl (born 1962), American cat burglar
Blane Smith (born 1954), American football player
Saint Blane, Scottish bishop and confessor
Blane Muise, English musician

See also
Blane (surname)
Blaine (given name)